Poshtkuh (also Romanized as Poshtkūh; also known as Pushteh Kūh) is a village in Rostaq Rural District, in the Central District of Khomeyn County, Markazi Province, Iran. At the 2006 census, its population was 360, in 78 families.

References 

Populated places in Khomeyn County